Return to Cranford (known in the United Kingdom as the Cranford Christmas Special) is the two-part second season of a British television series directed by Simon Curtis. The teleplay by Heidi Thomas was based on material from two novellas and a short story by Elizabeth Gaskell published between 1849 and 1863: Cranford, The Moorland Cottage and The Cage at Cranford. Themes from My Lady Ludlow, Mr Harrison's Confessions and The Last Generation in England are included to provide continuity with the first series.

The two-part Christmas special was transmitted in the UK by BBC One in December 2009. In the United States, it was broadcast by PBS as part of its Masterpiece Theatre series in January 2010. Cast members from the first season, including but not limited to Judi Dench, Imelda Staunton, Julia McKenzie, Deborah Findlay and Barbara Flynn reprised their roles, with Jonathan Pryce, Celia Imrie, Lesley Sharp, Nicholas Le Prevost, Jodie Whittaker, Tom Hiddleston, Michelle Dockery, Matthew McNulty, Rory Kinnear and Tim Curry joining the cast.

The new stories, which were written by Heidi Thomas and directed by Simon Curtis, took place in August 1844; a year after the wedding of Sophy Hutton and Dr Harrison.

Cast

Listed in alphabetical order:

Episode guide
Part One: August 1844

A year has passed after the final events in the first series. Matty Jenkyns has closed her tea shop and now spends her days playing with Tilly, the baby daughter of her maid Martha and carpenter Jem Hearne, while the pregnant Martha works in the kitchen.

Captain Brown readies the opening of a train station at Hanbury Halt. Unfortunately, the line will end there, five miles from Cranford. Lady Ludlow refuses to sell her land, which offers the only suitable passage for the railway line.

New and old residents of the village are introduced. Mrs. Bell, a widow with two grown children, continues deep mourning fourteen months after her husband's passing. The women of Cranford worry for the sake of daughter Peggy, who dresses in outdated clothes and has little opportunity to socialize with people her own age – including potential suitors.

Meanwhile, wealthy salt baron Mr. Buxton has returned to Cranford following the death of his wife. He brings two grown children: Eton-educated son William and ward Erminia, educated in Brussels. During several meetings, William and Peggy begin to have feelings for each other.

At Hanbury Court, Lady Ludlow is dying from bone cancer. The loyal Miss Galindo attends to her needs. Miss Galindo has tried to contact Lady Ludlow's long-absent son Septimus, living in Naples (ostensibly for his health), to alert him of his mother's poor health, but to no avail.

Lady Ludlow hears that her son is in London and will soon be traveling home to Cheshire. She waits for him, standing in her entry hall and refusing Miss Galindo's offer of a chair for support, but after several hours it is apparent that he is taking his time. Already weakened from her illness, she collapses and dies before her son arrives.

Meanwhile, Martha has gone into labor. She goes upstairs as Jem is summoned to Hanbury Hall for his duties as undertaker. While he is gone, she begins to hemorrhage. Matty sends for a doctor, but none is available except for the railway's barber-surgeon. He is unable to help and both Martha and her baby die.

Lady Ludlow's son Septimus arrives with his foppish Italian companion Giacomo. Their lavish lifestyle has drained Lady Ludlow's fortune: while Septimus built a still-unfinished villa on Lake Lugano, his mother took out a mortgage on her estate. Her former estate agent, Mr. Carter, now deceased, made provision in his will for her to be loaned the money (from his bequest to Harry Gregson) to pay off the mortgage. Septimus begrudges the fact that he must pay back this loan to Harry Gregson with interest.

Septimus arranges for a carriage to fetch Harry from his school. When Harry arrives, Septimus explains that in order to pay back the £20,000 plus interest that is owed to Harry, Septimus would have to sell the estate. Septimus convinces Harry that Mr. Carter cared little for the estate, but most desired a school in Cranford. Furthermore, selling the Hanbury estate would result in the loss of jobs and land tenancies for its many employees and residents. Septimus offers to solve this dilemma by giving Harry £5,000 immediately if he will agree to relinquish his claim to the balance of the money that is owed to him. Harry will then be able to pay for the village school, while Septimus will (he claims) retain the estate. Despite the fact that Harry is only fourteen and has had no further advice, they seal the deal by shaking hands in a "gentlemen’s agreement."

Captain Brown calls the town together and reveals that the railway will now be able to reach Cranford, as Septimus (who never intended to keep his agreement with Harry) has sold the entire Hanbury estate to the railway. Harry tells Miss Galindo of his agreement with Septimus and Miss Galindo intervenes to put a stop to it.

Many residents are still vehemently opposed to the railway's presence – including Mr. Buxton, who reveals that he owns a parcel of land previously thought part of Hanbury Park. He refuses to sell, blocking the railway's progress.

It is clear that Cranford will fall far behind the times without the railway's presence. The older residents remain opposed to the new ways and the threat of change, despite the fact that it will result in lost opportunities for the younger people to socialize and find work. As a result, Jem Hearne tells Matty that he and Tilly will have to leave Cranford if the railway doesn't reach the town.

Remembering her sister Deborah's traditional ideals, Matty realizes that she will have to modify her own positions to take care of the people she loves. She invites her friends and neighbors to accompany her on a train ride so they can see that it is not the evil force they might think it is. At first she worries that no one will come along, but as the train pulls up she sees her four friends, along with Mr. Buxton, his son William and Peggy Bell. The riders have varying degrees of misconceptions as they board the train and the jerky ride does little to dispel their fears. Still, as Matty herself begins to feel ill, others gradually relax and find themselves enjoying the trip.

In a separate carriage, William and Peggy sit alone on opposite benches. As the train lurches, they are thrown together, but William prevents Peggy from falling. He then confesses his love for her and asks her to marry him.

The train returns to Hanbury Halt, with some women expressing their excitement. Mr. Buxton's reaction is perhaps the strongest: he tells Matty that it took great courage to try to persuade the others. He is sorry to have stood in the way of progress; thanks to Matty's excursion, he has decided to sell his land and allow the train construction to proceed. As the episode ends, however, Matty's face reveals that she may now regret her actions.

Part Two: October to December 1844

When Mr. Buxton discovers that William and Peggy are engaged to be married, he refuses to give his blessing, hoping instead to match William with Erminia. Mr. Buxton then takes out his frustrations on Matty, blaming her for presenting the opportunity for the two to be alone on the train. Determined to marry Peggy anyway, William turns to Captain Brown for an internship at the railway. Captain Brown warns him that the work will be punishingly hard, but he perseveres.

Meanwhile, Peggy's brother Edward becomes engaged as an agent to Mr. Buxton and takes charge of the sale of the parcel of land to the railway company. However, Edward embezzles some of the money. In addition, he evicts Mr. Buxton's tenants, including Harry Gregson's family, while falsely implying to Mr. Buxton that other arrangements have been made for the tenants' accommodation. Harry Gregson's family leaves Cranford after failing to get word to him.

Mary's stepmother arrives in Cranford and the fact that Mary has gone back on her promise to marry Mr. Turnbull is revealed. Mary wants to pursue her writing and leaves for London, leaving Matty alone in the house.

Harry has been miserable at his school, where he has been tortured by some of the other students. He runs away back to Cranford to discover that his family have moved on. Miss Galindo and the Reverend Hutton are adamant that Harry must return to the school, as that was what Mr. Carter, Harry's benefactor, wished. A desperate and despairing Harry runs away, intending to stow away on the next train out of Cranford.

William, while working at the railway, stumbles across evidence of Edward's embezzlement. Meanwhile, a fugitive Edward arrives home. It is revealed that he stole the money to pay gambling debts. The Bells are told that if convicted of the crime, Edward will be deported as an indentured labourer to the colonies, most likely Australia. Mr. Buxton seizes upon the opportunity to offer Peggy a deal. He will arrange for Edward not to be charged if she calls off her engagement to his son William. After thinking it over, Peggy decides to refuse Mr. Buxton's offer. The police arrive with an arrest warrant for Edward and Peggy's sense of duty compels her to decide to accompany Edward on his flight to Canada, as on his own he is likely to succumb to his vices and be destroyed. They are to leave by the next train. She gives Miss Matty a letter to William to be delivered after the train departs.

Miss Matty decides not to wait to tell William what has happened and he races off to catch the departing train.

Whilst running away, Harry accidentally lets Bessie the cow loose without realising that he has. He jumps from an overpass onto a load of lumber in the train and almost immediately after that Bessie is hit by the train whilst grazing on the tracks. The train derails, so that the engine and carriages are knocked to the ground and William arrives at the site of the train crash searching for Peggy. William manages to save Peggy from the wreckage, only for Edward to steal the money and attempt to flee the scene. However, the locomotive explodes as he runs past and he is killed.

Miss Galindo and the Reverend find a seemingly dead Harry after realising he was on the train when it crashed. A minute later, Miss Galindo comments how the snowflakes are melting on Harry's eyelashes, as if he were still warm. Holding a mirror to his mouth, they realize that Harry is still breathing. They wrap him warmly and rush him back to shelter and care.

As everyone is devastated by the damage done by the train crash, Miss Matty decides she will use some of the money from her tea-selling to restore the assembly hall and hold a Christmas Eve party to bring everyone together and help their spirits heal. The ladies of Cranford work together with Matty's brother Peter (who will be the Master of Ceremonies) to bring the assembly hall back to life and arrange for a magician, Signor Brunoni to perform followed by a dance, which will celebrate the marriage of Captain Brown and Lady Glenmire as well as bring together the shocked people of Cranford. Invitations are sent and everyone accepts except Mrs. Jamieson, who has not forgiven her sister-in-law, the former Lady Glenmire, for marrying Captain Brown. Matty is also sad inside because she has not heard from Jem in a while about how he and little Tilly are doing. Meanwhile, Miss Galindo and the Reverend put a new proposition to the recovered Harry: Miss Galindo will pool her money with Harry's and use it to buy a house near Harry's boarding school, which Harry will be able to return to each day to enjoy Miss Galindo's care. With this support, they will fulfill Mr Carter's wish that Harry be educated and improve his position in life.

On the way to the evening at the hall, Mrs. Forrester is still seen to be grieving the death of Bessie, when Harry approaches her and presents her with a pretty new calf to replace Bessie as he apologizes for being the cause of her death. Mrs. Forrester delightedly goes down on her knees in the lantern-lit snow to welcome her new pet. As people gather in the newly refurbished hall, Mrs. Jamieson arrives on Peter's arm, having relented and she reconciles with the newly-weds. Signor Brunoni then starts his show and asks Miss Pole to enter his "magic box". He then asks Miss Matty to come up and open the box. She finds Miss Pole inside the box holding Tilly and Jem walks up the aisle and says that with the train coming to town he is moving back. The night goes ahead and the principal characters come together at last for a final waltz and grand circle where everybody is seen to be happy.

Production
Although Cranford is supposedly in Cheshire, none of the exterior scenes was filmed there. Locations used included Surrey, Hambleden, Windsor, Radnage, Leighton Buzzard, Berkhamsted, Wycombe, Syon House in Brentford, London and Isleworth in Greater London and Oxford. Interiors were filmed in Pinewood Studios. A large portion of filming was done at Lacock in Wiltshire (a location used for many films, including Pride and Prejudice and Emma for the BBC in 1995 and 1996, respectively and also for the Harry Potter films in 2000 and 2001 ). Filming of the railway sequences took place in Staffordshire at the Foxfield Railway.

Awards

BAFTA
Best Supporting TV Actress – Imelda Staunton (nominated)

62nd Primetime Emmy Awards
Outstanding Costumes for a Miniseries, Movie or a Special – Alison Beard and Jenny Beavan (winners)
Outstanding Cinematography for a Miniseries or Movie – Ben Smithard (winner)
Outstanding Miniseries (nominated)
Outstanding Lead Actress in a Miniseries or Movie – Judi Dench (nominated)
Outstanding Supporting Actor in a Miniseries or Movie – Jonathan Pryce (nominated)

Home media
Return to Cranford was released on DVD on 28 December 2009. A DVD box set was also made available on 28 December 2009 comprising the first series, The Making of Cranford as well as Return to Cranford.

References

External links

PBS Masterpiece Website

BBC Press release re  Cranford
Pictures from filming of Cranford
Cranford fan site
10 November 2007 Telegraph article
17 November 2007 Telegraph article
Episode guide at Digiguide.com

Online texts

The Cage at Cranford

Mr. Harrison's Confessions
The Last Generation in England

2009 British television series debuts
2009 British television series endings
BBC television dramas
Costume drama television series
Television series set in the 19th century
Television series by WGBH